Thomas Harrison (May 1, 1823 – July 14, 1891) was a Confederate States Army brigadier general during the American Civil War. He had a law practice in Waco, Texas after moving to Texas in 1843. He was a Mexican–American War veteran and Texas state legislator before the war. After the war, he was a district judge at Waco and was a Democratic Party politician and Presidential elector.

Early life
Thomas Harrison was born on May 1, 1823 in Jefferson County, Alabama.  He was raised in Monroe County, Mississippi. Thomas Harrison moved to Brazoria County, Texas in 1843 and studied law, establishing a law practice at Waco. He returned to Mississippi in order to become a member of the 1st Mississippi Rifles, commanded by future Confederate President Jefferson Davis during the Mexican–American War.

Harrison served a term in the Texas legislature from Harris County. He then settled in Waco, Texas. He was the captain of a volunteer militia company and served for a time in West Texas.

Family
Thomas Harrison was the son of Isham Harrison (November 4, 1788 Greenville County, South Carolina – September 30, 1863) and Harriet Kelly (February 11, 1789 – July 1, 1856 Aberdeen, Mississippi). He was a brother of Confederate Brigadier General James E. Harrison. Thomas married Sarah Elizabeth McDonald in 1858. Their restored  Greek Revival home still stands but has been moved the Pape Gardens in Waco and is available for guided tours. Thomas Harrison died July 14, 1891 at Waco, Texas and is buried in Oakwood Cemetery at Waco.

American Civil War
After service in West Texas, Harrison's militia company joined the 8th Texas Cavalry Regiment of the Confederate States Army, which was known as "Terry's Texas Rangers," after a measles epidemic caused a large reduction in the number of men in the regiment. Harrison began his service as captain and was promoted to major in early 1862. He fought with the regiment at the Battle of Shiloh, Siege of Corinth and Battle of Perryville. Harrison became colonel of the regiment on November 18, 1862, about six weeks before the Battle of Stones River (Murfreesboro, Tennessee) and led the regiment at that battle. Harrison was wounded in the hip on January 1, 1863 at Stones River. He subsequently led the regiment during the Tullahoma Campaign.

Between July 1863 and April 26, 1865, Harrison commanded cavalry brigades in the divisions of Brigadier General John A. Wharton (including Major General William T. Martin's detachment), Brigadier General Frank Crawford Armstrong and Brigadier General William Y.C. Humes in Major General Joseph Wheeler's Cavalry Corps of the Army of Tennessee and the Department of South Carolina, Georgia and Florida. His regiment and brigade often were used as scouts.

Harrison fought under the command of Cavalry Corps commander Major General Joseph Wheeler at the Battle of Chickamauga and in the Knoxville Campaign, Atlanta campaign, Savannah Campaign (Sherman's March to the Sea) and the Carolinas Campaign.

Despite being in brigade command for a considerable period of time, Harrison was not appointed as a brigadier general until near the end of the war, February 18, 1865, to rank from January 14, 1865. His brigade was placed in Brigadier General Robert H. Anderson's division in Lieutenant General Wade Hampton's (his second cousin) cavalry corps during the Carolinas Campaign. Harrison was wounded at the Battle of Monroe's Crossroads in North Carolina on March 10, 1865. He was paroled at Macon, Georgia on May 31, 1865 and pardoned on March 29, 1866.

Aftermath
Harrison returned to Waco after the end of the war. He was elected district judge. He became an anti-Reconstruction Democrat. He was a Democratic Party Presidential Elector in 1872.

See also

 List of American Civil War generals (Confederate)

Notes

References
 Boatner, Mark Mayo, III. The Civil War Dictionary. New York: McKay, 1988. . First published New York, McKay, 1959.
 Eicher, John H., and David J. Eicher. Civil War High Commands. Stanford, CA: Stanford University Press, 2001. .
 Sifakis, Stewart. Who Was Who in the Civil War. New York: Facts On File, 1988. .
 Stanchak, John E. "Harrison, Thomas" in Historical Times Illustrated History of the Civil War, edited by Patricia L. Faust. New York: Harper & Row, 1986. .
 United States War Department, The Military Secretary's Office, Memorandum relative to the general officers appointed by the President in the armies of the Confederate States--1861-1865 (1908) (Compiled from official records) Caption shows 1905 but printing date is February 11, 1908. Retrieved August 5, 2010.
 Warner, Ezra J. Generals in Gray: Lives of the Confederate Commanders. Baton Rouge: Louisiana State University Press, 1959. .

1823 births
1891 deaths
Confederate States Army brigadier generals
People of Texas in the American Civil War